Raquel Rodrigo (1915–2004) was a Cuban actress and singer who appeared in Spanish films. In 1935, she appeared in the music film Paloma Fair.

Filmography

References

External links 
 

1915 births
2004 deaths
Cuban film actresses
20th-century Cuban women singers
Musicians from Havana